Tupigea is a genus of Brazilian cellar spiders that was first described by B. A. Huber in 2000.

Species
 it contains twelve species, found only in Brazil:
Tupigea ale Huber, 2011 – Brazil
Tupigea altiventer (Keyserling, 1891) – Brazil
Tupigea angelim Huber, 2011 – Brazil
Tupigea cantareira Machado, Yamamoto, Brescovit & Huber, 2007 – Brazil
Tupigea guapia Huber, 2011 – Brazil
Tupigea lisei Huber, 2000 (type) – Brazil
Tupigea maza Huber, 2000 – Brazil
Tupigea nadleri Huber, 2000 – Brazil
Tupigea paula Huber, 2000 – Brazil
Tupigea penedo Huber, 2011 – Brazil
Tupigea sicki Huber, 2000 – Brazil
Tupigea teresopolis Huber, 2000 – Brazil

See also
 List of Pholcidae species

References

Araneomorphae genera
Pholcidae
Spiders of Brazil